El Moixer is a mountain of Catalonia, Spain. It has an elevation of 1,443 metres above sea level.

See also
Mountains of Catalonia

Mountains of Catalonia